Khalil Sweileh (born 1959) is a Syrian journalist and novelist. He was born in Al-Hasakah and studied literature at Damascus University. He has since worked for a number of cultural publications in various capacities.

Sweileh received the Naguib Mahfouz Medal in 2009 for his novel The Scribe of Love. In his acceptance speech, Sweileh mentioned that as a village boy, his chance discovery of a tattered copy of Mahfouz's novel Khufu's Wisdom was partly responsible for inspiring his love of literature.

His previous novels include Express Mail (2004), Do Not Blame Me (2006), and Zuhur, Sara, and Nariman (2008). Sweileh's novels have yet to be translated into English.

He won the Arab Journalism Award in 2010, and the Literature Award from the Sheikh Zayed Book Award in 2018 for his novel Ikhtibar al-Nadam (Remorse Test).

References

1959 births
People from Al-Hasakah
Damascus University alumni
Syrian novelists
Living people
Recipients of the Naguib Mahfouz Medal for Literature